The Kerala Legislative Assembly election of 1967 was held to constitute the fourth assembly in Kerala. This election, which was held after the 1965 one ended up in no government formation, resulted in the newly formed United Front alliance forming the government, while the INC, this time contesting alone was reduced to just 9 seats. E. M. S. Namboothiripad was sworn in as the Chief Minister on 6 March 1967.

Background
In the 1965 elections, no party was able to form a government in Kerala. No viable coalition took shape, and Kerala went back to President Rule for another 2 years.

Kerala again went back to the polls in 1967. Both communist parties - CPI (M) and CPI - along with smaller parties including SSP and Muslim League contested this election as a United Front. A total of seven parties contested in the front, and the front was known as Saptakakshi Munnani. Congress and Kerala Congress contested separately. The total polling percentage was 75.67%.

Constituencies
There were 133 constituencies in total, out of which 120 were General Category, 11 Scheduled Castes, and 2 Scheduled Tribe seats.

Political parties
The national parties contested were the Communist Party of India, Communist Party of India (Marxist), Indian National Congress, Praja Socialist Party, Sanghata Socialist Party, and Swatantra Party along with the state parties Indian Union Muslim League and Kerala Congress.

Results

|- style="background-color:#E9E9E9; text-align:center;"
! class="unsortable" |
! Political Party !! Flag !! Seats  Contested !! Won !! Net Change  in seats !! % of  Seats
! Votes !! Vote % !! Change in vote %
|-
| 
| style="text-align:left;" |Bharatiya Jana Sangh
|
| 22 || 0 || NA ||  0  || 55,584 || 0.88 || NA
|- style="background: #90EE90;"
| 
| style="text-align:left;" |Communist Party of India
| 
| 22 || 19 ||  16 || 14.29 || 538,004 || 8.57 ||  0.27
|- style="background: #90EE90;"
| 
| style="text-align:left;" |Communist Party of India (Marxist)
| 
| 59 || 52 ||  12 || 39.10 || 1,476,456 || 23.51 ||  3.64
|-
| 
| style="text-align:left;" |Indian National Congress
|  
| 133 || 9 ||  27 || 6.77 || 2,789,556 || 35.43 ||  1.88
|- 
| 
| style="text-align:left;" |Praja Socialist Party
|
| 7 || 0 || NA || 0 || 13,991 || 0.22 || NA
|- style="background: #90EE90;"
| 
| style="text-align:left;" |Samyukta Socialist Party
|
| 21 || 19 || 6 || 14.29 || 527,662 || 8.4 ||   0.27
|- 
| 
| style="text-align:left;" |Swatantra Party
|
| 6 || 0 || NA || 14.29 || 13,105 || 0.21 ||  NA
|- 
| 
| style="text-align:left;" |Kerala Congress
|
| 61 || 5 ||   1 || 3.76 || 475,172 || 7.57 ||   5.01
|- style="background: #90EE90;"
| 
|
| 15 || 14 ||  8 || 10.53 || 424,159 || 6.75 ||  2.92
|-
| 
|
| 75 || 15 ||  3 || 11.28 || 531,783 || 8.47 ||  5.27
|- class="unsortable" style="background-color:#E9E9E9"
! colspan = 3|
! style="text-align:center;" |Total Seats !! 133 ( 0) !! style="text-align:center;" |Voters !!  8,613,658 !! style="text-align:center;" |Turnout !! colspan = 2|6,518,272 (75.67%)
|}

By Constituency

Government formation
The United Front performed spectacularly swept most of the seats. Congress and Kerala Congress were decimated with 9 and 5 seats respectively. E M S became the Chief Minister for the second time. Second E. M. S. Namboodiripad Ministry had 14 members. For the first time in Kerala's history, the cabinet also included members from Muslim League. K. Karunakaran became the opposition leader in the assembly.

Fall of EMS Government
CPI (M) and CPI continued to have suspicions with each other. Due to the alleged high-handedness of CPI (M) in governance, most smaller parties were unsatisfied. This period also was marked by a series of student strikes and police firings. CPI, SSP & Muslim League eventually became a group within the front and worked together. Many ministers from the smaller parties resigned eventually, and many parties subsequently left the front. On 24 October 1969, EMS submitted resignation owing to the loss of majority in the assembly.

Achutha Menon Ministry 
Within a week of the resignation of E M S Namboothiripad, M N Govindan Nair of CPI informed the Governor that their party was ready to form an alternate government. CPI formed a government with outside support from Congress. C. Achutha Menon became the Chief Minister of Kerala on 1969, 1 November. The First Achutha Menon Ministry had 8 members.

See also
 1965 Kerala Legislative Assembly election
 1970 Kerala Legislative Assembly election

References

1967
1967
Kerala